The United States Sports Academy is a private university focused on sports and located in Daphne, Alabama. It offers bachelor's, master's, and doctoral degree programs as well as certificate programs. Founded in 1972, the academy has provided its sports programs to more than 60 countries around the world.

History
Thomas P. Rosandich founded the Academy in 1972 in response to an inferior performance by the United States Olympic team in the 1972 Summer Olympics. Athletes were lacking quality coaching and training. The academy's programs served as an education resource to upgrade coaching through instruction, research, and service.

The academy's campus is also home to the American Sport Art Museum and Archives (ASAMA), which was founded in 1984. The collection contains more than 1,000 works of sport art from world-renowned artists, many of whom have been honored by the academy as Sport Artist of the Year. The academy is also developing an outdoor sculpture park on campus, which is dedicated to celebrating sport with the erection of numerous environmentally friendly sculptures.

The academy also hosts the Awards of Sport series, also known as its tribute to "The Artist and the Athlete". These awards honor sports figures for their accomplishments and achievements in such things as performance, humanitarian activities, fitness, and media.

Amos Alonzo Stagg Coaching Award

The Amos Alonzo Stagg Coaching Award is presented each year, for the preceding calendar year. It was first presented in 1985, for the 1984 sports year. Each recipient receives the USSA's Order of the Eagle Exemplar medal and Academy Rosette. 
For list of awardees through 2014, see footnote

There is also a separate Amos Alonzo Stagg Award presented by the American Football Coaches Association (AFCA).

Carl Maddox Sport Management Award
The Carl Maddox Sport Management Award is presented each year. It was first presented in 1991.

Notable alumni

Aimee Buchanan, American-born Olympic figure skater for Israel
Vicky Bullett, professional basketball player and coach, 1988 Olympic gold medalist
Marco Cardinale, Italian sports scientist
Mark Chay, Singaporean Olympic swimmer, sports executive and Nominated Member of the Parliament of Singapore
Ed Comeau, Canadian lacrosse coach
Lynn Conkwright, professional bodybuilder
Latoya Dacosta, Jamaican association football executive
Steve Hawkins, college basketball coach
Quentin Hillsman, college basketball coach
Tony Hobson, college basketball coach
Mike Leach, college football coach
Dennis Lindsey, professional basketball executive
Chad Lunsford, college football coach
Noemi Lung Zaharia, Romanian swimmer, 1988 Olympic silver medalist
Greg McDermott, college basketball coach
Michael Nakazawa, Japanese professional wrestler
Conor O'Shea, Irish rugby union player and coach
LaTanya Sheffield, Olympic hurdler

References

External links
 

 
Sports academies
Private universities and colleges in Alabama
Universities and colleges accredited by the Southern Association of Colleges and Schools
Education in Baldwin County, Alabama
Educational institutions established in 1972
Museums established in 1984
1972 establishments in Alabama